XHOLA-FM is a radio station on 105.1 FM in Puebla, Puebla, Mexico. The station is owned by Grupo Imagen and carries the Imagen Radio news/talk network.

History
XHOLA received its first concession on June 1, 1992. It was owned by Mastretta Guzmán Comunicación, S.A. de C.V. and related to the Mastretta car company, originally with the name "La Radiante 105.1". It was sold to Imagen in 2004.

References

Radio stations in Puebla
Radio stations established in 1992
1992 establishments in Mexico
Grupo Imagen